The 1976–77 season was the 31st season in FK Partizan's existence. This article shows player statistics and matches that the club played during the 1976–77 season.

Players

Squad information

Friendlies

Competitions

Yugoslav First League

Yugoslav Cup

European Cup

First round

Statistics

Goalscorers 
This includes all competitive matches.

Score overview

See also
 List of FK Partizan seasons

References

External links
 Official website
 Partizanopedia 1976-77  (in Serbian)

FK Partizan seasons
Partizan